Los del Mar (Spanish for those from the sea, referring to Marbella) was a short-lived Canadian music duo, best known for their 1995 cover version of the Los del Río 1993 song "Macarena", which was included on their album Macarena: The Hit Album. 

The main member, Pedro Castaño, is still touring with this song. Although it just missed the Top 40 in the UK Singles Chart (peaking at number 43 while the Los Del Río version reached number 2), it was included in the game Samba de Amigo.

They are specialized in Andalusian folk music, especially sevillanas, the most typical light music of Andalusia.

Discography

References

Musicians from Andalusia
Spanish musical groups